The lac Brisson is a freshwater body of the watershed of the Brisson River, located in the unorganized territory of Rivière-aux-Outardes, in the Manicouagan Regional County Municipality, in the administrative region of Côte-Nord, in the province of Quebec, in Canada.

The east side of Lac Brisson is served by a forest road connecting to the southwest with a network of forest roads. On the east side the path to the English river allows road access from the southeast.

Forestry is the main economic activity around the lake.

Geography 
Lac Brisson is located in the southern part of the unorganized territory of Rivière-aux-Outardes. This slightly misshapen fish-shaped lake, the tail of which faces north, towards the mouth. It has three small islands.

Toponym 
The toponym "Lac Brisson" derives from the name of the river of the same name.

The toponym "Lac Brisson" was formalized on December 5, 1968 at the Place Names Bank of the Commission de toponymie du Québec.

See also 
 Gulf of St. Lawrence
 List of rivers of Quebec

Notes and references

External links 
 .

Lakes of Côte-Nord
Charlevoix Regional County Municipality